Canada One is a 12-metre class yacht that competed in the 1983 Louis Vuitton Cup and finished fourth. In 1985 she was re-built into Canada II.

References

12-metre class yachts
1980s sailing yachts
Louis Vuitton Cup yachts
Sailboat type designs by Bruce Kirby
Sailing yachts of Canada